Dharbandora is a sub-division and Taluka of Goa, India. At present, it has a population of 30,000 to 40,000 people.

History
The creation of a new Dharbandora Taluka, the 12th Taluka in Goa, was announced by the Chief Minister of Goa Digambar Kamat on 25 March 2010, in his Budget Speech before the Goa Legislative Assembly. A Committee chaired by the Revenue Minister of Goa Jose Philip D'Souza steered the creation of the Taluka.

By a notification dated 16 March 2011, the Government of Goa notified the 18 villages of Aglote, Bandoli, Camarconda, Caranzol, Codli, Colem, Cormonem, Darbandora, Gangem, Molem, Moissal, Piliem, Sancordem, Sangod, Sigao, Sonauli, Surla and Usgao to incorporate the Dharbandora Taluka. Gangem and Usgao were carved out from Ponda taluka while all the remaining villages were earlier a part of the Sanguem Taluka. However, there was resistance from the people of Gangem and Usgao villages against the decision of including both villages in the Dharbandora Taluka. Vide another notification dated 20 May 2011, the villages of Gangem and Usgao were reverted to Ponda taluka.

Dharbandora Taluka came into existence as a part of the South Goa district on 4 April 2011.  Satish R. Prabhu was the first Mamlatdar of the Dharbandora Taluka.

Administration
Dharbandora is a Sub Division headed by the Deputy Collector of Dharbandora. The Dharbandora Taluka is headed by the Mamlatdar and there also exists a Joint Mamlatdar. The Taluka also has other offices such as the Block Development Office, Zonal Agricultural Office, Regional Transport Office,  Civil Registrar-cum-Sub-Registrar, etc. The Government of Goa has already notified a new Sub-Treasury Office for Dharbandora, however, the same has not yet been established.

A new Government Office Building Complex has been built in Dharbandora which will house all the government offices in Dharbandora.

Census Data 2011 
There is no reliable data for the Demographics and Literacy rate in this new Sub-Division of Goa. The primary reason is that it came into existence after the 2011 census.

Tourism

The famous Dudhsagar Falls are in Mollem. The Bhagwan Mahaveer Sanctuary and Mollem National Park are also situated in the Dharbandora Taluka. There are many ecotourism sites in Dharbandora. The Biodiversity Park at Mollem and the Satpal arboretum are prominent.

Dharbandora Taluka is also home to prominent temples like the Mahadev Temple, Tambdi Surla and the Barabhumi Temples. The Cave at Sigao is a protected monument.

References

Taluks of Goa
Geography of South Goa district